Maithai Huajaisin (8 January 1968 —), is a Thai singer from Isan area. He is popular in the genre Mor lam sing and as the last member of Sieng Isan band, having released 35 original albums and 122 singles as well as many compilations. He has alias Phra Ek Yai or Maycheal Jackson (ไหมเคิล แจ็คสัน) or Michael Jackson of Isan.

1968 - 1993 : Early life
His birth name is Monchai Raksachart. He was born in Nakhon Ratchasima Province and grew up in Kalasin Province.

1994 – present : Musical career
He started on stage in 1994, as lead vocal from Sieng Isan Mor lam band, with stage name Maithai Uraiporn, with Lookplare Uraiporn, Saeng-arun Bunyu and Ratchada Phalaphon. He recorded a studio album with Lookplare Uraiporn between 1995 and 2008. His song in 2003, See her in Germany was most popular in Thai social media in  2010s, and was used to make meme by Thai netizen to parody the Thai king Vajiralongkorn, who likes to reign from Bavaria.

In 2008, he registered as an artist with GMM Grammy and renamed his stage name to Maithai Jaitawan. He has 5 original albums from Grammy, but he got out in 2012, and was arrested by Royal Thai Police because he took his songs in Grammy, the record label that he was affiliated with.

In 2013, he registered as an artist with Topline Diamond and renamed his stage name to Maithai Huajaisin, which is his present stage name.

Personal life
He married Maneejan Khammool in 1985. They have a daughter, but they divorced. In 1993, he lived with Waraporn Maneejan, but Waraporn died 2 years later. In 2012, he married Jannapha Insopha, when she was studying in Secondary 4. He is 28 years older than her.

Discography

With Lookplare Uraiporn
 1994 - Mor lam Dao Rung 1
 1995 - Mor Lam dao Rung Yok Kam Lang 2
 1996 - Phee Mar Thee Lang
 1996 - Kho Pen Khae Pi Chai
 1997 - Super 2 Dao Rung Chut 1
 1997 - Super 2 Dao Rung Chut 2
 1997 - Super 2 Dao Rung Chut 3
 1997 - Super 2 Dao Rung Chut 4
 1998 - Chumphae Chumphon Chumphuang
 1999 - Ue Hue Sadue Chap
 1999 - Koi Jai Nong Jin
 2000 - Lak Rak Klap Naeorop 
 2000 - Rak Sao Nakhorn Sawan
 2001 - Yak Cho (with Saeng-arun Bunyu and Ratchada Phalaphon)
 2001 - Lang Khaen Duai Nam Ta
 2003 - See her in Germany

Solo

Topline Diamond
 2004 - Buk See Der
 2015 - Tem Jai Yom Hai Tua

GMM Grammy
 2007 - Bao Phan Phuen Mueang
 2008 - Nak Soo Huajai Seng
 2009 - Welcome to Thamma
 2010 - Bor Mee Sith Nuei
 2011 - Sing Khanong Lam (with Monkaen Kaenkoon)
 2011 - No.5 Sangkad Phak Phuea Ther

Partial Discography
 Phae Rob Sanam Rak (1995)
 Leek Thang Hai Thei (1997)
 Rak Sao Nahorn Sawan (2000)
 See her in Germany (2003)
 Nong Ma Kab Khamwa Chai (2008)
 Phua Sam Rong (2015)

References

External links

1968 births
Living people
Maithai Huajaisin
Maithai Huajaisin
Maithai Huajaisin
Maithai Huajaisin
Maithai Huajaisin